Jim B. Tucker is a child psychiatrist and Bonner-Lowry Professor of Psychiatry and Neurobehavioral Sciences at the University of Virginia School of Medicine. His main research interests are documenting stories of children whom he claims remember previous lives, and natal and prenatal memories. He is the author of Life Before Life: A Scientific Investigation of Children’s Memories of Previous Lives, which presents an overview of over four decades of reincarnation research at the Division of Perceptual Studies. Tucker worked for several years on this research with Ian Stevenson before taking over upon Stevenson's retirement in 2002.<ref>{{cite book
  |last = Shroder
  |first = Tom
  |title = Old Souls: The Scientific Evidence For Past Lives
  |publisher = Simon & Schuster
  |pages= 230–232
  |isbn =  0-684-85192-X
|title-link = Old Souls: The Scientific Evidence For Past Lives
 |year = 1999
 }}</ref>

Tucker has also appeared in printSoul Search Discover Magazine, June 2007. as well as broadcast mediaThe Charles Adler Show CJOB/68. June 2009Good Morning America ABC, July 2006 talking about his work. His investigation of the case of Cameron Macaulay was featured in the British TV network, "Channel 5", documentary Extraordinary People - The Boy Who Lived Before.

 Biography 

Tucker attended the University of North Carolina at Chapel Hill, where he graduated Phi Beta Kappa with a B.A. Degree in psychology and a medical degree. He is currently Bonner-Lowry Professor of Psychiatry and Neurobehavioral Sciences, and in addition to conducting research, he was the medical director of the University of Virginia Child & Family Psychiatry Clinic for nine years.

He lives in Charlottesville, Virginia, with his wife, Christine McDowell Tucker, a clinical psychologist, and has presented at academic and public conferences.
Tucker felt unfulfilled by his work in child psychiatry, but was open to the possibility that humans are more than their material bodies and wished to investigate the matter further.  Though raised as a Southern Baptist, Tucker does not subscribe to any particular religion, and claims to be skeptical about reincarnation,
but sees it as providing the best explanation for phenomena associated with the strongest cases investigated to date. After reading Ian Stevenson's work, Tucker became intrigued by children's reported past-life memories and by the prospect of studying them.

 Reincarnation research 

While Stevenson focused on cases in Asia, Tucker has studied U.S. children.

Tucker reports that in about 70% of the cases of children claiming to remember past lives, the deceased died from an unnatural cause, suggesting that traumatic death may be linked to the hypothesized survival of self. He further indicates that the time between death and apparent rebirth is, on average, sixteen months, and that unusual birth-marks might match fatal wounds suffered by the deceased.

Tucker has developed the Strength Of Case Scale (S.O.C.S.), which evaluates what Tucker sees as four aspects of potential cases of reincarnation;Mills, Antonia. ‘Back from Death: Young Adults in Northern India Who as Children Were Said to Remember a Previous Life, with or without a Shift in Religion (Hindu to Moslem or Vice Versa)’, in Anthropology and Humanism, Volume 31. December 2008 "(1) whether it involves birthmarks/defects that correspond to the supposed previous life; (2) the strength of the statements about the previous life; (3) the relevant behaviors as they relate to the previous life; and (4) an evaluation of the possibility of a connection between the child reporting a previous life and the supposed previous life".

Critics have argued there is no material explanation for the survival of self, but Tucker suggests that quantum mechanics may offer a mechanism by which memories and emotions could carry over from one life to another.

 Media coverage 

Since taking over the research into claimed past-life memories from Stevenson in 2002, Tucker has been interviewed about reincarnation in print and broadcast media in the United States, United Kingdom and Canada.

In 2006, Tucker investigated the case of Cameron Macaulay as part of the Channel 5 Documentary Extraordinary People: The Boy Who Lived Before. Tucker's investigation took him firstly to Glasgow to interview the six-year-old boy and his mother Norma about Cameron's reported recollections of life on the isle of Barra in the Outer Hebrides, around two hundred miles from the family's home in Glasgow. Tucker then accompanied the family as they traveled to Barra in an attempt to verify Cameron's statements about life on the island. Cameron's descriptions of his previous family home were entirely accurate; while the family name of "Robertson" also rang true, nothing could be found of the man Cameron recalled as his father on the island.

The documentary also briefly covered another of Tucker's cases: that of Gus Taylor from the Midwest U.S., who claimed from around the age of a year and a half to be his own grandfather returned to the family. In addition to speaking of a previous life, Tucker notes that both boys speak of falling through a 'hole' or ‘porthole’ from one life to the next.

In 2009, he was interviewed on Larry King Live'' about the cases he has studied.

See also 
 Ian Stevenson

References

External links 
Official website
Jim Tucker’s Bio - University of Virginia School of Medicine

Reincarnation researchers
Living people
University of Virginia School of Medicine faculty
American psychiatrists
Parapsychologists
Place of birth missing (living people)
Year of birth missing (living people)